Eğribük (also known as Barbaros bay or Tahta Liman) is a small Mediterranean bay with ruins in the beach, in south  Turkey.

Eğribük is in the Silifke ilçe (district) of Mersin Province at  It is at the end point in the canyon of the Akdere creek. The sea is to the east of the bay.

The bay which is not on the highway is a rather secluded recreation spot with a natural beach. In the middle of the beach there are some ruins. The ruins belong to Palaiai (old city). Although there are very few ruins, the underwater survey reveals that most of Palaiai ruins are submerged in the water. 
There is also a necropolis area in the shrubbery to the west of the beach. Judging from the grave types it is believed that Palaiai was a Roman town.

References

Bays of the Mediterranean
Landforms of Mersin Province
Silifke District
Bays of Turkey